Tony Sun (born 20 February 1978) is a Taiwanese actor, singer, host and baseball player. He is the leader of Taiwanese group 5566.

Career 

Sun gained much solo experience by releasing several well-received albums in Taiwanese Hokkien in the 1990s. However, his popularity waned when he had to fulfill his mandatory military service. Sun was signed under Jungiery since his earlier career days.

Personal life 
On 21 November 2011, Sun married actress Han Yu. In October 2015, the couple announced their divorce; they had no children.

Filmography

Discography

Solo albums
Phoenix
Language: Mandarin
Release date: May 31, 2013

Track list:
 不死鸟
 要了我的命
 紧握幸福
 学习爱情夜
 恋爱关键
 看不见
 多久
 有你在身边
 不死鸟 (instrumental)
 要了我的命 (instrumental)

Awards and nominations

References

External links 

1978 births
Living people
5566 members
Taiwanese male television actors
Taiwanese Hokkien pop singers
Businesspeople from Kaohsiung
Baseball players from Kaohsiung
Male actors from Kaohsiung
Taiwanese idols
Musicians from Kaohsiung
21st-century Taiwanese singers